The Danish People's Party is an active political party in Denmark.

Danish People's Party may also refer to:
Danish People's Party (1993), a defunct local-level political party of Odense
Danish People's Party (1941–43), a national-socialist party during the German occupation in World War II

See also
Party of the Danes